Let's Dance 2023 is the eighteenth season of the Swedish television dance competition series Let's Dance. It will premiere on 18 March 2023 on TV4. David Lindgren returns as presenter.

On 11 March, Petra Mede announced that she had quit as presenter for the show. Citing problems with her back as the main issue.

Contestants
This year will see the first female dance pair with Nilla Fischer dancing with Cecilia Ehrling.

Scoring chart

Red numbers indicate the lowest score of each week.
Green numbers indicate the highest score of each week.
 indicates the couple that was eliminated that week.
 indicates the couple received the lowest score of the week and was eliminated.
 indicates the couple withdrew from the competition.
 indicates the couple returned to the competition after previously being eliminated.
 indicates the couple finished in the bottom two.
 indicates the couple earned immunity from elimination.
 indicates the winning couple.
 indicates the runner-up couple.
 indicates the third place couple.

Average chart

References 

2023
2023 Swedish television seasons
TV4 (Sweden) original programming